The Stearns Administrative and Commercial District, located on Old U.S. Route 27 in Stearns, Kentucky, is a  historic district which was listed on the National Register of Historic Places in 1988.  It included six contributing buildings and one non-contributing building.

The main element is the Stearns Company General Offices Building, "a two-and one-half story frame building that utilizes dormers, porches, and roof lines characteristic of the American Four Square House." The McCreary County Museum now uses the building.

References

Historic districts on the National Register of Historic Places in Kentucky
Colonial Revival architecture in Kentucky
Commercial buildings completed in 1903
National Register of Historic Places in McCreary County, Kentucky
1903 establishments in Kentucky
Commercial buildings on the National Register of Historic Places in Kentucky
American Foursquare architecture